Chiang Kai-shek College is a Chinese Filipino institution of higher learning founded by Chinese Filipinos, recognized by the government of the Republic of the Philippines and the Republic of China (Taiwan). The school offers programs in the Preschool (幼稚園), Grade School (小學), Junior High School (初中), Senior High School (高中), and College (大學). It is the largest Chinese Filipino school in population in the Philippines. The school is located at 1274 Padre Algue St. Tondo, Manila, Philippines. The school is named after Chiang Kai-shek, the second president of the Republic of China during the Kuomintang regime.

History
In 2007, Joan Sy-Cotio, after serving for many years, retired as the college president. Bee Ching Ong Kian Koc succeeded her but after she finished her term in 2013, Dory Poa, an alumna of CKSC, who finished her doctorate degree at Stanford University, has become the college president. Poa had a number of international working experience with schools in the United States, Hong Kong, and Singapore.

Campuses

Main Campus
Two four-story and five five-story concrete buildings comprise the Padre Algue Campus (Main Campus). Its notable facilities include Chiang Kai-shek Memorial Hall (a multipurpose auditorium), a Little Theatre, a conference room for the Chiang Kai-shek College Alumni Association, libraries, two gyms, Speech Learning Center, a Music room, a Math Lab, a guidance office, a dance studio, a computer (Mac) lab, Visual Arts Studios (IB), and the Home Economics Room.

The Chiang Kai-shek Memorial Hall is a fully air-conditioned multipurpose auditorium. The auditorium is a popular venue for conventions, seminars, regional and national competitions and social gatherings of alumni. Found at the center of the main campus, the open court quadrangle can accommodate 3,000. It is where the high school and elementary students hold their flag ceremony. The main campus’ gymnasium has a seating capacity of 2,500. This basketball court has been a favorite site for Metro Manila Filipino-Chinese basketball games and College Women's Basketball Tournament. The gymnasium may also be used for playing volleyball, badminton and table tennis. The Wong Chun Seng Memorial Pre-School Buildings maintain facilities for music, arts, sciences, languages, and library activities as well as a playground.

Narra Campus
The college and graduate school are now located at the nine-story Narra Building. Its facilities include chemistry laboratory and gyms. A gymnasium in Narra Campus is named after Chinese-Filipino community leader Benjamin Chua Jr.

The Narra Campus now houses the Senior High School as well.  In pursuance of the K-12 curriculum, the school implemented a Bridging Program in 2015 to shorten the transition to the K-12 by temporarily implementing a trimestral school year.  With the Grade 10 (formerly Fourth Year graduating students) successfully promoted to Grade 11, the Senior High School classes were transferred to the Narra Campus in 2016 under the headship of Dr. Raymond Datuon.  Under the K-12, the Narra Campus offers the three major tracks (ABM, STEM and HUMSS) as well as the core and specialized courses.  In 2017, with Dr. Datuon moving to another school, the headship was assigned to Mr. Fidel Savares.

New Campus
The new campus will be built on a 10-hectare lot in South Forbes Golf City Silang, Cavite. The lot was donated by Ambassador K. C Ng, an alumnus of the school.

Notable alumni
Lucio Tan (陳永栽) - A prominent Chinese-Filipino business magnate
Henry Sy Sr. (施至成) - Retail King of the Philippines, founder of SM Investments Corporation
Tony Tan-Caktiong (陳覺中) - Founder of Philippine fastfood chain Jollibee
Stephen S.F. Chen (陳錫蕃) - National Policy Advisor to the President of the Republic of China
Lim Eng Beng (林嬰鳴) – PBA player
Justin Chua – PBA player
JC Tiuseco – actor
Baldwin Kho – Filipino-Chinese visual artist and Humanitarian
EJ Obiena – Pole Vaulter
James Yap (葉克強) - Filipino-Chinese basketball player

References

External links
 http://www.cksc.edu.ph /

Chinese-language schools in Manila
Universities and colleges in Manila
High schools in Manila
Education in Tondo, Manila
Educational institutions established in 1939
Chiang Kai-shek
1939 establishments in the Philippines